The culture of Northern Ireland relates to the traditions of Northern Ireland. Elements of the Culture of Ulster and the Culture of the United Kingdom are to be found.

Heritage
Since 1998, the Ulster Museum, Armagh Museum, Ulster Folk and Transport Museum and the Ulster American Folk Park have been administered by the National Museums and Galleries of Northern Ireland.

The Linen Hall Library, the oldest library in Belfast, has endured many changes of fortune since its foundation in 1788, but has maintained a vision of providing access to literature and local studies to the population at large.

 Abbeys and priories in Northern Ireland
 Gardens in Northern Ireland
 Giant's Causeway
 List of country houses in the United Kingdom
 Museums in Northern Ireland
 National parks of Northern Ireland

Cuisine

Northern Ireland's best known chefs include Paul Rankin and Michael Deane.

The best known traditional dish in Northern Ireland is the Ulster fry.
Two other popular meals are fish and chips or 'Bangers and Mash' (Sausages and Creamed Potatoes)

A unique speciality to Northern Ireland is Yellowman. Yellowman is a chewy toffee-textured honeycomb and is sold in non-standard blocks and chips and is associated with the Ould Lammas Fair in Ballycastle, County Antrim, where it is sold along with other confectionery and often dulse.

Dulse is commonly used in Ireland, where it can be used to make white soda bread. It can be found in many health food stores or fish markets and can be ordered directly from local distributors. it is also traditionally sold at the Ould Lammas Fair. It is particularly popular along the Causeway Coast. Although a fast-dying tradition, many gather their own dulse. Along the Ulster coastline from County Down to County Donegal in the Republic of Ireland, it is eaten dried and uncooked as a snack.

Language

English is the most spoken language in Northern Ireland. There are also two recognised regional languages in Northern Ireland: the Irish language (see Irish language in Northern Ireland) and the local variety of Scots known as Ulster Scots. Northern Ireland Sign Language and Irish Sign Language have been recognised since 29 March 2004. A third, British Sign Language is also used.

At the 2001 census, Chinese was the most widely spoken minority language in Northern Ireland, with Shelta, Arabic and Portuguese also spoken by a significant number of people. Since the census, however, an influx of people from recent EU accession states is likely to have significantly increased numbers of speakers of languages from these countries. Detailed figures on these changes are not yet available.

Sports

Some team sports are played on an All-Ireland basis, while in others Northern Ireland fields its own team.
 Belfast Giants
 Gaelic football
 Hurling
 Gaelic handball
 Milk Cup, an international youth association football competition held in Northern Ireland
 Northern Ireland national football team
 Royal Portrush Golf Club
 Ulster GAA
 Ulster Rugby
Rowing

Internationally well-known sports people include:
 George Best – footballer, born in Belfast
 Sir Danny Blanchflower – footballer
 Darren Clarke – golfer, born in Dungannon
 Joey Dunlop
 Jack Kyle
 Dave Finlay
 Paddy Hopkirk
 John Watson (racing driver)
 Mike Gibson (rugby union)
 Mike Bull
 Peter Chambers
 Alex Higgins
 David Humphreys
 Eddie Irvine
 Dave McAuley
 Willie John McBride
 Tony McCoy
 Wayne McCullough
 Dame Mary Peters
 Ronan Rafferty
 Dennis Taylor
 Andrew Trimble
 Norman Whiteside
 Cormac McAnallen
 Rory McIlroy
 Daryl Gurney

Arts

Literature

Despite its small geographical size, Northern Ireland prolifically produces internationally renowned writers and poets from a wide variety of disciplines. Irish language literature was the predominant literature in the pre-Plantation period. The Ulster Cycle is pertinent to the history of literature in the territory of present-day Northern Ireland. Ulster Scots literature first followed models from Scotland, with the rhyming weavers, such as James Orr, developing an indigenous tradition of vernacular literature. Writers in the counties which now form Northern Ireland participated in the Gaelic Revival.

 Ciarán Carson
 Brian Friel
 Seamus Heaney
 John Hewitt
 C. S. Lewis
 Bernard MacLaverty
 Louis MacNeice
 Ian McDonald
 Medbh McGuckian
 Paul Muldoon
 Flann O'Brien
 Frank Ormsby
 Tom Paulin
 Richard Rowley
 Bob Shaw
 Irish Pages - Ireland's Premier Literary Journal, Edited in Belfast

Visual arts

Noted visual artists from Northern Ireland include:
 Bogside Artists
 Basil Blackshaw, born in Glengormley, Painter
 Max Clendinning, post-modernist architect and interior designer
 Willie Doherty, Photographer & video artist twice nominated for the Turner Prize
 Garth Ennis, born in Holywood Co. Down, is creator of popular Vertigo series Preacher
 Terry George, born in Co. Down, director of Hotel Rwanda
 John Kindness, Painter and Sculptor
 Sir John Lavery, born in Belfast, was a representative of the group known as the Irish Impressionists.
 Neil Shawcross, painter
 Paul Seawright, Photographer & Professor at the University of Ulster
 Victor Sloan, MBE, Photographer
 Sir Hans Sloane, Born in Killyleagh, Co. Down, in 1660, his famous collection was opened to the public as the British Museum in 1759
 John Butler Yeats, Painter

Performing arts

Noted actors from Northern Ireland include:
 Stephen Boyd
 Anthony Boyle
 Kenneth Branagh
 Brian Friel
 Ciarán Hinds
 Siobhán McKenna
 Colin Morgan
 Liam Neeson
 Sam Neill
 James Nesbitt
 Stephen Rea
 Ray Stevenson
 Richard Dormer
Conleth Hill

Film and television

See also Cinema of Northern Ireland

Northern Ireland Screen, a government agency financed by Invest NI and the European Regional Development Fund, provides financial support to film and television productions in Northern Ireland. Among the works it has supported is the 2011 HBO television series Game of Thrones, which is filmed principally in Belfast's Paint Hall studios and on location elsewhere in Northern Ireland.

Belfast hosts the Belfast Film Festival and the CineMagic film festival, as well as several independent cinemas including Queen's Film Theatre and Strand Cinema.

Music

Noted musicians from Northern Ireland include:
 Ash

 Agnelli & Nelson
 Bearface
 Bicep (duo)
 Brian Kennedy
 Vivian Campbell
 Derek Bell
 D Ream
 Duke Special
 Candida Doyle
 The Freshmen
 Gary Moore
 Sir James Galway
 General Fiasco
 Tony McAuley
 Neil Hannon
Nadine Coyle (of Girls Aloud)
 Phil Kieran
 Ruby Murray
 Snow Patrol
 Stiff Little Fingers
 Two Door Cinema Club
 The Undertones
 Therapy?
 Ulster Orchestra
 Hamilton Harty
 Michael Alcorn
 The Answer
 Van Morrison and Them
 David McWilliams
 Foy Vance
 VerseChorusVerse
 In Case of Fire
 De Grote Boze Wolf

Crafts
August Craft Month is an annual coordinated programme of events that showcase the work of craft makers in Northern Ireland and from across the United Kingdom, Ireland and Europe. It is organised by Craft Northern Ireland.

Songs

A traditional song of the Unionist and Loyalist communities is The Sash, which may be considered offensive or at least distasteful by the Nationalist communities, particularly when it is used to threaten or incite violence.

Symbolism and traditions

Unionists tend to use the Union Flag and sometimes the Ulster Banner, while nationalists usually use the Flag of Ireland, or sometimes the Flag of Ulster. Both sides also occasionally use the flags of secular and religious organisations they belong to. Some groups, including the Irish Rugby Football Union and the Church of Ireland use the Flag of St. Patrick as a symbol of Ireland which lacks the same nationalist or unionist connotations.

The flax flower, representing the linen industry, has been used as a neutral symbol – as for the Northern Ireland Assembly.

St. Patrick's Day is celebrated by both nationalists and unionists, while "The Twelfth" is celebrated only by unionists.

Celebrations to mark the anniversary of the Battle of the Boyne are held every Twelfth of July and draw huge crowds. The Apprentice Boys of Derry also organise commemorative events. The bowler hat is a symbol of Orangeism.

See also

 Irish art
 Irish literature
 Irish music
 Culture of Ireland
 Culture of Belfast
 Ulster Scots
 Ulster Irish
 Audiences NI
 Lyric Theatre (Belfast)
 Belfast Festival at Queens
 Odyssey
 Waterfront Hall
 Tennents ViTal
 The Black North

References

External links
 Culture Northern Ireland website 
 National Museums and Galleries of Northern Ireland
 Department of Culture, Arts and Leisure (DCAL)
 Arts Council of Northern Ireland
 Poetry Forum for Northern Ireland,
 Scoil Cheoil na Botha- music festival in the border region of Scotstown, Co. Monaghan